Two-Minute Warning is a 1976 action thriller directed by Larry Peerce and starring Charlton Heston, John Cassavetes, Martin Balsam, Beau Bridges, Jack Klugman, Gena Rowlands, and David Janssen. The film was nominated for an Academy Award for Best Film Editing.

Plot
An unknown sniper (Warren Miller) positions himself at the Los Angeles Memorial Coliseum before a professional football championship dubbed "Championship X" (Ten) between Baltimore and Los Angeles, similar to the Super Bowl. He is spotted by a Goodyear Blimp camera. Police and SWAT team are immediately called in by the stadium manager Sam McKeever (Martin Balsam).

Police Captain Peter Holly (Charlton Heston), working with SWAT team Sergeant Chris Button (John Cassavetes), devises a plan to capture the sniper before the conclusion of the game.

Many of the fans attending the game are introduced. They include Steve and Janet (David Janssen and Gena Rowlands), an argumentative middle-aged couple; Stu Sandman (Jack Klugman), a gambling addict; a Catholic priest (Mitchell Ryan), who is a friend of quarterback Charlie Tyler (Joe Kapp); young married couple Mike and Peggy Ramsay (Beau Bridges and Pamela Bellwood); an elderly pickpocket (Walter Pidgeon) and his young accomplice (Juli Bridges, the then-wife of Beau Bridges); and football fan Al (David Groh), who begins flirting with Lucy (Marilyn Hassett) when he notices her date (Jon Korkes) is more interested in the game than in her.

The stadium's maintenance director, Paul (Brock Peters), discovers the sniper's presence and attempts to confront him. The sniper strikes Paul with the butt of his rifle and, undetected by fans, causes him to fall several stories, leaving him severely injured. SWAT team members position themselves on stadium light towers to take aim on the sniper's nest.

Mike Ramsay spots the sniper with his binoculars. He reports it to the police, but rather than thank him, they question him suspiciously and then physically overpower him.

Shortly after the game's two-minute warning, the SWAT team is given the green light to go after the sniper. Seeing that he is surrounded, the sniper opens fire, shooting randomly into the crowd. His shots cause a massive riot in which the panicked fans spill onto the field.

Many security men, Coliseum personnel, and spectators are killed or wounded. Marksmen perched atop stadium light towers fall or hang by their tethers after getting shot. Fleeing spectators are crushed or trampled underfoot while rushing towards exit tunnels. A few lose their footing while climbing down wall-ivy trestles. Steve, Stu, Chris, Peggy, and the pickpocket are among those shot (Chris and Peggy survive). Mike escapes from police custody during the riot and is reunited with Peggy and their children once the stadium empties of people. Ultimately, the sniper is shot by Peter who, along with Chris, and other members of the SWAT team, arrest him.

Searching through his wallet, the officers learn the sniper's name: Carl Cook. Cook dies while in custody, revealing nothing about his intent. Button points out that although they know nothing about Cook, over the next few weeks the media, via newspapers and television, will discover all the unknown details about Cook's life: what schools he attended, his nice mother, pet dog, former gym teacher, the body count, and question why the officers had to kill him. Peter sees Button's gunshot wound, and wonders if a doctor had looked at it, to which Button replies, "It's no big deal." Peter then replies, "Don't be a hero, Sergeant. I'll drop you off at the hospital. Come on." Button reluctantly follows Peter, while Sam looks toward the empty football stadium, feeling sad that a lot of people died in the stadium. Peter drives Button to the hospital off-screen, and the film ends.

Cast

Production
When released in 1976, Two-Minute Warning was promoted as an entry into the disaster film genre, complete with an all-star cast attempting to survive an immense riot created by the sniper.  Joe Kapp, a former NFL quarterback for the Minnesota Vikings and Boston Patriots, plays Baltimore's veteran quarterback Charlie Tyler.

The majority of the movie was filmed following the 1975 football season at the Los Angeles Memorial Coliseum.  The game footage for the full stadium shots of the L.A. Coliseum was from the Pac-8 college football game between Stanford and USC, played on November 8.

Release
Universal Studios devised a gimmick where moviegoers were not allowed to enter the theater at the moment the football game's two-minute warning began in the film.

Another film with a similar disaster-at-the-Super Bowl theme, Black Sunday, was released the following April to decent reviews but poor box office.

Television version
Due to the film's explicit violence and uncomfortable detail of a homicidal sniper acting alone and without apparent motivation, NBC negotiated with Universal Studios to film additional scenes for its television premiere in 1978. The new scenes would detail an art theft, with the sniper serving as a decoy so robbers could escape without detection. The additional scenes, totaling 40 minutes in length, were added for the film's TV showing while 45 minutes of the original version were removed. Director Larry Peerce disowned the TV version, which credits the pseudonymous "Gene Palmer" as director and Francesca Turner (who also helped doctor David Lynch's Dune for TV) for the "teleplay".  When shown on network television, this version of Two-Minute Warning is often shown rather than the original theatrical release. The television version had never been released to video and DVD; however it did finally appear as an extra on the Blu-ray from Shout! Factory on June 28, 2016.

Critical reception
Two-Minute Warning received negative reviews from critics, as it holds a 29% rating on Rotten Tomatoes from 14 reviews.

Roger Ebert gave the film a rating of one star out of four, writing, "I knew going in what the movie was about (few films have such blunt premises) and I knew Two-Minute Warning was supposed to be a thriller, not a social statement. But I thought perhaps the movie would at least include a little pop sociology to soften its blood-letting. Not a chance. It's a cheerfully unashamed exploitation of two of our great national preoccupations, pro football and guns." Richard Eder of The New York Times wrote that since the viewer is told nothing about the sniper's character, "the efforts of the police to catch the sniper—all their ladder-climbing and maneuvering—are no more exciting  than watching a group of linesmen at work up a telephone pole." Gene Siskel of the Chicago Tribune gave the film two stars out of four and wrote, "I'm sure the fast-buck artists who made this film justify it as a mirror of society and its faceless killers. But that's just an excuse to make a picture that will hold appeal only for those who like to see other people blown away by high-powered rifles. This is a contemptible motion picture." Arthur D. Murphy of Variety noted "above-average plotting, acting and direction, including one of the better mob scenes filmed in many a year." Kevin Thomas of the Los Angeles Times called it "a taut and terrific thriller" and "an example of superb film craftsmanship." Gary Arnold of The Washington Post called it "a middling suspense thriller" with characters "so sketchy and arbitrary that the victims and survivors might as well be determined by flips of the coin."

References

External links
 
 
 

1976 films
1970s action thriller films
American football films
American action thriller films
Films directed by Larry Peerce
American neo-noir films
Films about assassinations
Films about snipers
Universal Pictures films
Films based on American novels
Films scored by Charles Fox
Films set in Los Angeles
Filmways films
Films produced by Edward S. Feldman
1970s English-language films
1970s American films
Films shot from the first-person perspective
Super Bowl in fiction